Bernard Fiifi Abban (born 31 March 1989), ABBAN is a Reggae singer and songwriter from Ghana, West Africa. He deals in different genre of music ranging from Lovers Rock, Root Culture, Hip Life, Reggae, Dancehall.

Abban completed Christian Methodist Senior High School in 2008 and proceeded to Jayee University College where he became the entertainment committee president.

Early life

Abban started his music career recording on riddim instrumentals. In March 2018, he rebranded from Da Governor to Abban and signed under the auspices of Irie Ites Studio.

He dropped his first reggae single Agoro which won him massive audience and recognition in the Ghana Music Industry.

Rising To Popularity 

Under Irie Ites Studios, Abban launched a campaigned against Drug Abuse to educate the youth on the effect of drug menace. He was supported by Stonebwoy, Patoranking and Ras Kuuku.

He has performed at the S-Concert, Ashaiman to the World Concert, Kuchoko Festival and several major event with live performance.

Discography

Album 
 The Otherside EP

Singles 
 Agoro
 Hold Me Down
Ahuofe
 Pretty Lady
 Hail Legends
 Say No To Drugs
 Coronavirus
 Charley
Straight & Tight

Awards and nominations

References

Living people
21st-century Ghanaian male singers
21st-century Ghanaian singers
1989 births
People from Accra